John H. Carr (November 14, 1849 - ?)  was a farmer and member of the Arkansas Legislature in 1891. He represented Phillips County, Arkansas. He served in the Arkansas House of Representatives in 1891.

Carr was born and raised in Helena, Arkansas. He was a sergeant in the state militia. a Republican, he served as a state representative in 1889, 1890, and 1891. He was a Baptist and a member of a Masonic Lodge. He represented Phillips County.

He was included in a photo montage and series of profiles of African American state legislators serving in Arkansas in 1891 published in The Freeman newspaper in Indianapolis. He voted against a poll tax. He and other member of the 1893 Arkansas House of Representstives were photographed.

See also
African-American officeholders during and following the Reconstruction era

References

African-American state legislators in Arkansas
Republican Party members of the Arkansas House of Representatives
1849 births
Year of death missing